The Rue du Bailli or Baljuwstraat (Dutch) is a shopping street in Brussels, Belgium, running through the municipalities of Ixelles and the City of Brussels. It runs from the Avenue Louise/Louizalaan to La Trinité, via the /, the / and the /.

See also

 List of streets in Brussels

References

Streets in Brussels
City of Brussels
Ixelles